Rebecca Louise Keoghan  is a New Zealand dairy farmer and professional company director.

Biography 
Keoghan completed a degree in medical science from the University of Otago, and also holds diplomas in advanced business management and leadership. She has served on the boards of Fire and Emergency New Zealand, Timaru District Holdings, Tai Poutini Polytechnic, Buller Holdings, Westland Milk Products, Judicial Control Authority, Forest Growth Holdings and Invercargill City Forests.

Keoghan began her career in medical science in Invercargill, then spent some time working in the UK, Australia before returning to New Zealand, shifting to the West Coast and commenced dairy farming with her husband. Keoghan left her combined careers in executive roles and governance to focus solely on adding value in the governance field in 2019.

Recognition 
In 2016, Keoghan won Fonterra Dairy Woman of the Year. In the 2017 Queen's Birthday Honours, she was appointed a Member of the New Zealand Order of Merit, for services to business, particularly the dairy industry, and in 2018 she received the New Zealand Woman of Influence Award in the rural category.

References

Living people
Year of birth missing (living people)
University of Otago alumni
Members of the New Zealand Order of Merit
New Zealand Women of Influence Award recipients
Dairy farmers